Naked Apes and Pond Life is the eighth full-length album by Shriekback.  The 2000 release was a surprise resurfacing for the band, after many years of quiet.  It gathered many songs performed in intimate appearances in London over the preceding years, recorded in the studio by Barry Andrews, Martyn Barker, Lu Edmonds (last seen on 1985's Oil & Gold), as well as Simon Edwards and Mark Raudva.

Many of the tracks are instrumentals, but the strong vocal-led "Berlin" and Big Night Music-esque "Everything's on Fire" are standouts.

Critical reception
AllMusic wrote that "much of Naked Apes & Pond Life finds Shriekback playing a sort of twisted world music that resembles the organic/electronic mix of Big Night Music, but adds a variety of exotic instruments and percussion."

Track listing
"Stimulate the Beaded Hamster" - 1:17
"Pond Life" - 4:05
"Hostage" - 4:12
"Invisible Rays" - 3:48
"Claxon Bolus" - 1:36
"Massive Custard" - 1:44
"JP8" - 2:17
"Unsong" - 4:50
"Berlin" - 4:12
"Baby Lion" - 3:00
"Everything's on Fire" - 4:26
"Keep-Net Stevenson" - 1:42
"String, Sedatives, Weaponry" - 3:26
"Anal Piss-Machine" - 1:34

Personnel
Barry Andrews - keyboards, synthesizers, accordion, vocals
Martyn Barker - drums, percussion
Lu Edmonds - guitar, saz, oud, percussion
Simon Edwards - bass, sintir, percussion
Mark Raudva - bodhrán, didgeridoo, mandolin, percussion

References

2000 albums
Shriekback albums